Bilal Mohammed (born on June 2, 1986) is a Qatari footballer who plays as a defender.

He is a member of Qatar national football team since 2003. He scored the goal that won Qatar the golden medal for the 2006 Asian Games against Iraq in the final game which ended 1–0.

Career
Mohammed started his footballing career in the youth team of Al Gharafa at the age of 10. He was coached by the youth coach of Al Gharafa, Zamalek star Ali Khalil. He went on to make his senior team debut against Qatar SC in 2003. He also made his debut for the Qatar national team in 2003, in a friendly against Algeria in France.

He earned his 100th cap against Malaysia on 19 November 2013.

International goals

Club career statistics
Statistics accurate as of 21 August 2011

1Includes Emir of Qatar Cup.

2Includes Sheikh Jassem Cup.

3Includes AFC Champions League.

Personal life
Bilal Mohammed is of Sudanese origin. His father and uncles were also professional footballers.

He married the daughter of former Sudanese international footballer, Shenan Khidr, in February 2012. The ceremony was attended by a number of Qatari and Sudanese footballers.

See also
 List of men's footballers with 100 or more international caps

References

External links
Player profile - doha-2006.com

1986 births
Living people
Qatari footballers
Qatar international footballers
2004 AFC Asian Cup players
2007 AFC Asian Cup players
2011 AFC Asian Cup players
2015 AFC Asian Cup players
FIFA Century Club
Al-Gharafa SC players
Al-Markhiya SC players
Umm Salal SC players
Qatar Stars League players
Qatari people of Sudanese descent
Sudanese emigrants to Qatar
Naturalised citizens of Qatar
Asian Games medalists in football
Footballers at the 2006 Asian Games
Asian Games gold medalists for Qatar
Association football defenders
Medalists at the 2006 Asian Games